Jamie Orton (born 8 February 1980 in London) is a British racing driver.

Racing record

Career summary

*Current season

References

External links
 

1980 births
Living people
Sportspeople from London
Porsche Carrera Cup GB drivers
Britcar 24-hour drivers
Ginetta GT4 Supercup drivers